Ramsar sites are natural locations under the protection of the Ramsar Convention for the conservation and sustainable utilization of wetlands.

The first Russian sites registered in the Ramsar Convention, on 11 October 1976 (during the Soviet era), were Kandalaksha Bay Lake Khanka and the Volga River delta.

List of Ramsar sites in Russia

Classification codes for Ramsar wetland types
 Ramsar classification codes are listed for each site in descending order of area cover at the site.

See also
 Ramsar Convention
 List of Ramsar sites worldwide

References

External links
 The Ramsar Convention on Wetlands
 United States National Ramsar Committee



 
Ramsar
Russia
Ramsar